Keishla He (born ) is a Puerto Rican social media personality who posts about her identities as a person of Asian descent in Puerto Rico. She also speaks out against xenophobia and racism related to the COVID-19 pandemic.

Life 
She was born  and raised in Puerto Rico. Her parents immigrated from China and opened a restaurant. Spanish was her primary language and she spoke Cantonese with her family and learned English in school. She was the only Asian student at her Puerto Rican high school.

In 2020, she started posting Spanish-language videos on TikTok. She was inspired to speak out against the xenophobia and racism related to the COVID-19 pandemic. Her posts garnered additional views, in part, due to surprise by people of her Spanish fluency. She began focusing her content on her identity as a person of Asian descent in Puerto Rico. By August 2020, she had 52.7 thousand followers on TikTok. This increased to 1.8 million by May 2022.

References

Citations

Bibliography 

Living people
2002 births
Puerto Rican people of Chinese descent
American TikTokers